Soyuz TM-33 was a crewed Russian spaceflight which launched on October 21, 2001, on the Soyuz-U launch vehicle. It carried Russian cosmonauts Viktor Afanasyev, Konstantin Kozeyev, and French cosmonaut Claudie Haigneré to the International Space Station.

Crew

Docking with ISS
Docked to ISS: October 23, 2001, 10:44 UTC (to nadir port of Zarya)
Undocked from ISS: April 20, 2002, 09:16 UTC (from nadir port of Zarya)
Docked to ISS: April 20, 2002, 09:37 UTC (to Pirs module)
Undocked from ISS: May 5, 2002, 00:31 UTC (from Pirs module)

Mission highlights
14th crewed mission to ISS.

Soyuz TM-33 is a Russian astronaut-transporting spacecraft that was launched by a Soyuz-U rocket from Baikonur at 08:59 UT on 21 October 2001. It carried two Russian and one French astronaut to the International Space Station (ISS). It docked with the ISS at 10:44 UT on 23 October. This new crew spent eight days on the ISS, and returned on the older Soyuz TM-32 at 04:59 UT on 31 October. The new Soyuz remained docked as a lifeboat craft for the then current crew of three (two Russian and one American) astronauts.

External links

 NASA Soyuz-33 (launch)/Soyuz-32 (return) Taxi Crew

Crewed Soyuz missions
Spacecraft launched in 2001
Orbital space tourism missions
Spacecraft which reentered in 2002
Spacecraft launched by Soyuz-U rockets